The Laurentian Sow is a 1st or 2nd century AD Roman marble sculpture of a sow with feeding suckling pigs, now on display in the Ny Carlsberg Glyptotek in Copenhagen, Denmark.

Iconography

The  relates to the story of Aeneas according to a prophecy of a priest of Apollo. Æneas lands on the shores of Old Latium with his son Ascanius behind him; on the left, a sow tells him where to found his city.

History
The sculpture was acquired by the Ny Carlsberg Glyptotek on 1 January 1909.

References

External links

 3D image of the sculpture
 Source

Sculptures of the Ny Carlsberg Glyptotek
Ancient Roman sculpture
Sculptures of classical mythology
Marble sculptures in Copenhagen
Pigs in art